Eurathea is a small genus of very small sea snails, pyramidellid gastropod mollusks or micromollusks in the tribe Chrysallidini within the family Pyramidellidae.

Distribution
So far, species in this genus have been described from Australia, Vanuatu and the Solomon Islands.

Life habits
Little is known about the biology of the members of this genus. As is true of most members of the Pyramidellidae sensu lato, they are ectoparasites.

Species
Species within the genus Eurathea include:
 Eurathea humerica Laseron, 1959 - type species, the type locality is Darwin, Australia. The length of the shell is 3.2 mm.
 Eurathea rissoiformis Peñas & Rolán, 2017
 Eurathea solomonensis Peñas & Rolán, 2017

References

 Laseron, C. F. (1959). Family Pyramidellidae (Mollusca) from Northern Australia. Australian Journal of Marine and Freshwater Research. 10(2): 177–267.
 Peñas A. & Rolán E. (2017). Deep water Pyramidelloidea from the central and South Pacific. The tribe Chrysallidini. ECIMAT (Estación de Ciencias Mariñas de Toralla), Universidade de Vigo. 412 pp

Pyramidellidae